1992—2002 is a double disc compilation album by Underworld, released 3 November 2003 on JBO. The album was released in conjunction with the single "Born Slippy .NUXX 2003".

Summary 
This compilation marked the first album appearances of "Big Mouth" (listed here as "Bigmouth"), "Dirty", "Rez" and "Spikee"; all of which had previously only been available as 12" vinyl singles. Furthermore, it contained some of their more popular soundtrack pieces, including "Dark & Long (Dark Train)" and "Born Slippy .NUXX", both used in the film Trainspotting; "Rez", as used in Vanilla Sky; "Cowgirl" from Hackers; "Moaner" from Batman & Robin; and "8 Ball", which was featured in The Beach. The original versions of "Dark & Long" and "Born Slippy" were not included in the compilation.

The version of "Born Slippy .NUXX" included on this album is an exclusive edit of the song with a new outro, while "Push Upstairs" is an extended mix that was limited to a 12" promotional vinyl on its original release in 1999. "Cowgirl" appears in the lightly edited form which appeared on dubnobasswithmyheadman. The full length "album version" of "Moaner" is also included, as opposed to the "long version" used on Beaucoup Fish, which cut the extended outro (curiously, this compilation's version of "Moaner" does not fade out, unlike other copies of the "album version".) A promotional version of 1992–2002 also included the unedited version of "Dirty" and a previously unreleased extended version of "Jumbo", the latter of which would later appear on 1992–2012 The Anthology.

Tim Booth of James has ranked it among his favourite albums.

Track listing
All songs by Underworld, unless noted.

CD version

Promotional pressing
A very small number of releases contained extended versions of "Dirty" (which includes a coda that contains a sample from "Dolls' Polyphony", from the soundtrack to the anime film Akira) and of "Jumbo" (which was later given a wide release on 1992–2012 The Anthology.)

UK Vinyl version

Charts

Certifications

References

Underworld (band) compilation albums
2003 compilation albums
2003 video albums
V2 Records compilation albums
V2 Records video albums
Junior Boy's Own video albums
Junior Boy's Own compilation albums
Underworld (band) video albums